Dissanayake Mudiyanse Anuradha Lanka Pradeep Jayaratne (born 22 December 1985) is a Sri Lankan politician. He is a member of parliament. He was the former State Minister of Rural irrigation and tanks development , former member of the Central Provincial Council and is the son of the former Sri Lankan Prime Minister D. M. Jayaratne.

Education
Educated at Trinity College, Kandy and Royal College, Colombo, he gained an LL.B. from the University of Buckingham and completed the law exams at the Sri Lanka Law College taking oaths as an Attorney at law in 2010. He thereafter gained an LL.M. from the University of Colombo.

Political career
After becoming a lawyer, Anuradha went into active politics working as Private Secretary in 2010 to his father, who was the Prime Minister. In 2013, he contested the 2013 Sri Lankan provincial council election and was elected to the Central Provincial Council gaining the highest number of preferential votes yet Sarath Ekanayake was preferred over him for the post of Chief Minister.

He contested the 2015 parliamentary election and was elected to parliament from Kandy. In September 2015, he was appointed  Deputy Minister of Mahaweli Development and Environment by President Maithripala Sirisena. The following year, August 2016 Jayarathne was appointed the Chief Organizer of SLFP, Ududumbara, Kandy District. He was re-elected in the 2020 parliamentary election and was appointed State Minister of Rural irrigation and tanks development.

See also
List of political families in Sri Lanka

References

External links
Personal Website

Sinhalese lawyers
Sri Lankan Buddhists
Members of the 15th Parliament of Sri Lanka
Members of the 16th Parliament of Sri Lanka
Members of the Central Provincial Council
Living people
Sri Lanka Freedom Party politicians
United People's Freedom Alliance politicians
1985 births
Alumni of Royal College, Colombo
Alumni of Trinity College, Kandy
Alumni of the University of Buckingham
Alumni of the University of Colombo